Trevor Lloyd (born 14 February 1952) is  a former Australian rules footballer who played with Fitzroy in the Victorian Football League (VFL).

Notes

External links 		
		
				
		
		
Living people		
1952 births		
		
Australian rules footballers from Victoria (Australia)		
Fitzroy Football Club players